La Laguna is a corregimiento in San Carlos District, Panamá Oeste Province, Panama with a population of 1,132 as of 2010. Its population as of 1990 was 778; its population as of 2000 was 968.

References

Corregimientos of Panamá Oeste Province